Fifth Avenue Line refers to the following transit lines:
Fifth Avenue Line (Brooklyn elevated) (former rapid transit)
Madison and Fifth Avenue buses (bus)
Fifth Avenue Line (Brooklyn surface) (bus, formerly streetcar)